Heiko Schaffartzik (born 3 January 1984) is a German professional basketball player for Hamburg Towers of the German Basketball Bundesliga. Schaffartzik is also a member of the Germany national basketball team.

Professional career
In 2011 Schaffartzik signed a contract with Alba Berlin. In the 2012–13 season, he played his first season in the Euroleague, he averaged 6.2 points per game in the competition.

On August 1, 2013, Schaffartzik signed a two-year contract with Bayern Munich. In the 2013–14, he won the Basketball Bundesliga with Bayern, after his team beat Alba 3–1 in the Finals.

On September 28, 2015, Limoges CSP announced it had signed Schaffartzik.

In June 2016, Schaffartzik signed a one-year contract with Nanterre 92. On April 22, 2017, Schaffartzik won the French Cup after beating Le Mans Sarthe Basket 79–96 in the Final. He was named the French Basketball Cup Final MVP after scoring 24 points in the Final. On April 25, Schaffartzik won the FIBA Europe Cup with Nanterre, as the team beat Élan Chalon on aggregate over two legs.

On June 12, 2017, Schaffartzik re-signed with Nanterre 92 for one more season.

On July 2, 2018, Schaffartzik signed a one-year contract with Tecnyconta Zaragoza. On August 10, 2018, Schaffartzik parted ways with Tecnyconta Zaragoza after the injury suffered in the right knee in a pre-season training and whose recovery did not allow him to play at the beginning of the season.

On September 16, 2019, he has signed with Hamburg Towers of the German Basketball Bundesliga.

German national team
Schaffartzik has also been a member of the senior German national basketball team. Schaffatzik played at the EuroBasket 2009, EuroBasket 2011, EuroBasket 2013 and EuroBasket 2015. He also played at the 2010 FIBA World Championship.

Statistics

Personal
Schaffartzik was cured of leukemia when he was a child. He now visits sick children every year with his team in the hospital where he was treated.

Honours
Alba Berlin
Basketball Bundesliga (2): 2002–03, 2003–04
BBL-Pokal (2): 2003, 2004

Bayern Munich
Basketball Bundesliga (1): 2013–14

Career statistics

Euroleague

|-
| style="text-align:left;"| 2012–13
| style="text-align:left;"| Alba Berlin
| 21 || 1 || 20.7 || .339 || .341 || .917 || .9 || 2.6 || .1 || .0 || 6.2 || 5.2
|-
| style="text-align:left;"| 2013–14
| style="text-align:left;"| Bayern Munich
| 22 || 1 || 20.8 || .407 || .329 || .857 || 1.8 || 2.8 || .3 || .0 || 5.9 || 5.6
|-
| style="text-align:left;"| 2014–15
| style="text-align:left;"| Bayern Munich
| 10 || 2 || 21.8 || .509 || .462 || .824 || 2.3 || 2.8 || .5 || .0 || 8.8 || 9.6
|- class="sortbottom"
|colspan=2 style="text-align:left;"|
| 53 || 5 || 20.9 || .399 || .360 || .873 || 1.5 || 2.7 || .3 || .0 || 6.6 || 6.2

References

External links
 Heiko Schaffartzik  at beko-bbl.de
 Heiko Schaffartzik at draftexpress.com
 Heiko Schaffartzik at eurobasket2015.org
 Heiko Schaffartzik at euroleague.net

1984 births
Living people
2010 FIBA World Championship players
Alba Berlin players
Basketball Löwen Braunschweig players
Basketball players from Berlin
EWE Baskets Oldenburg players
FC Bayern Munich basketball players
German expatriate basketball people in France
German expatriate basketball people in Turkey
German men's basketball players
Giessen 46ers players
Hamburg Towers players
Limoges CSP players
Riesen Ludwigsburg players
Nanterre 92 players
Point guards
Türk Telekom B.K. players